The State I'm In is the debut album from American recording artist Louie Louie, released on April 4, 1990 via WTG Records and Epic Records. It is his only album so far to have charted on the Billboard 200, peaking at #136. The lead single "Sittin' in the Lap of Luxury" is also his only hit so far on the Billboard Hot 100, peaking at #19.

Track listing

Chart positions

References

1990 debut albums
Epic Records albums
Louie Louie (musician) albums